Glen and Bessie Hyde were newlyweds who disappeared while attempting to run the rapids of the Colorado River through Grand Canyon, Arizona in 1928. Had the couple succeeded, Bessie Hyde would have been the first woman known to accomplish this feat.

Early life
Glen Rollin Hyde, born December 9, 1898, was a farmer from Twin Falls, Idaho; Bessie Louise Haley, born December 29, 1905, was a divorcee originally from Parkersburg, West Virginia. The couple first met in 1927 on a passenger ship traveling to Los Angeles and married April 10, 1928, the day after Bessie's divorce from her first husband was finalized.

Colorado River trip
Glen Hyde had some experience with river running, having traveled the Salmon and Snake Rivers in Idaho with "Cap" Guleke, an experienced river runner, in 1926. Bessie was more of a novice. In October 1928, the Hydes went to Green River, Utah where Hyde built his own boat, a twenty-foot wooden sweep scow, the type used by river runners of that time in Idaho. The couple set off down the canyons of the Green and Colorado Rivers on October 20, 1928, as a honeymoon adventure trip. Glen wanted to set a new speed record for traveling through the Grand Canyon, while also putting Bessie in the record books as first documented woman to run the canyon.

Disappearance
They were last seen Sunday, November 18, 1928, when they boated away downriver below Hermit Rapid. The couple had hiked Bright Angel Trail out of the canyon to resupply a few days earlier. At the South Rim they approached photographer Emery Kolb at his studio and home on the canyon rim, where they were photographed before returning down into the canyon. Some Colorado River historians, such as Otis R. Marston, note that Adolph G. Sutro rode from Phantom Ranch to Hermit Rapid with them in the scow. The Sutro reference regarding riding with the Hydes for one day and possibly being the last to see them is mentioned specifically in the Ken Burns PBS documentary series National Parks: America's Best Idea, and in Marston's book.

Search
A search was launched by Glen's father Rollin even before the couple were to be considered overdue at Needles, California on December 6, 1928. On December 19, a search plane spotted their scow adrift around river mile 237; it was upright and fully intact, with the supplies still strapped in. A camera recovered from the boat by Emery and Ellsworth Kolb revealed the final photo to have been taken near river mile 165, probably on or about November 27. The search uncovered evidence to indicate the couple made it as far as river mile 226, Diamond Creek, where it is believed they made camp. Bessie noted in her journal that they had cleared 231 Mile Rapid. Historian Otis R. Marston made a compelling case that the couple were most likely swept out of the boat when their scow hit submerged rocks in the heavy rapids near river mile 232. In describing the rapid, Marston noted "...pieces of granite wall lie submerged where they have damaged, snared, or capsized more boats than any other location in the canyon." No trace of the Hydes has ever been found.

Theories
The romance of the story, coupled with the lack of any conclusive evidence as to the fate of the Hydes, has led to a number of legends and rumors. An elderly woman on a commercial Grand Canyon rafting trip in 1971 announced to other rafters that she was Bessie Hyde, and that she had stabbed her abusive husband to death and escaped the canyon on her own. This was unlike what was known of Glen Hyde. The woman later recanted this story. There was some speculation after the death of famed rafter Georgie Clark in May 1992 that she was really Bessie Hyde, due to some documents and a pistol found in her effects after her death, but no conclusive evidence for such a link was ever found, not to mention that Clark's early life is well documented.

The skeletal remains of a young male found on the canyon rim in 1976 with a bullet inside the skull were later proven not to be those of Glen Hyde. Suspicion had turned to photographer Emery Kolb, because the remains were discovered on his property and he was one of the last persons known to have seen the couple alive. However, a later forensic investigation conducted by the University of Arizona concluded that the skeleton belonged to a man no older than 22 and who had died no earlier than 1972, ruling out the possibility that it was the remains of Glen Hyde. In late 2008, a donation of photographs and documents to the Grand Canyon Museum Collection, and an effort by the Coconino County Sheriff's Office to solve the county's cold cases led to the identification of the Kolb skeleton as that of an unidentified suicide victim found in the park in 1933.

References in literature and culture
Glen and Bessie Hyde's story was the subject of a novel, Grand Ambition by Lisa Michaels, which was nominated for an IMPAC Dublin Literary Award and optioned for a film. Investigations and reports on the legend of Glen and Bessie Hyde include Sunk Without a Sound: The Tragic Colorado River Honeymoon of Glen and Bessie Hyde, in a National Public Radio report for NPR's Morning Edition, and the musical River's End by Cheryl Coons (book and lyrics) and Chuck Larkin (music). Both Grand Ambition and Sunk Without a Sound were chosen for the ONEBOOK Arizona program in 2005. Otis "Dock" Marston devoted an entire chapter to the couple, titled "Hyde and Go Seek" in his exhaustive recounting of the first 100 river runners through the Grand Canyon. His book, From Powell to Power, was published posthumously in 2014. Their story also was included in the PBS series The National Parks: America's Best Idea. Araya from the show Mystery Hunters also investigated the Grand Canyon to see what had happened to the newly wedded couple. The couple's story was more recently featured on the podcast Stuff You Should Know in February 2018 and the fourth special of Unsolved Mysteries. The story also inspired the Marissa Nadler song "Bessie, Did You Make It?" in her 2022 album The Path of the Clouds.

See also
 Missing persons
 List of people who disappeared

References

External links

 Glen & Bessie Hyde – A Folksy and Interesting Tale
 Guide to the Glen Hyde collection, Northern Arizona University
 Hyde material in the Otis R. "Dock" Marston Huntington Library Collection
 Hyde images in the Otis R. "Dock" Marston Huntington Library Photographic Collection

1920s missing person cases
1928 in Arizona
Early Grand Canyon river runners
Married couples
Missing person cases in Arizona
November 1928 events in the United States
People from Parkersburg, West Virginia
People from Twin Falls, Idaho
Year of death unknown